The 2005 Liga Indonesia Premier Division (also known as the Liga Djarum Indonesia for sponsorship reasons) was the 11th season of the Liga Indonesia Premier Division, the top Indonesian professional league for association football clubs.

Teams

Team changes

Promoted to Premier Division 
 Arema
 PSDS
 Persibom
 Persegi
 Persijap
 Persema
 Persekabpas
 Petrokimia Putra
 Persiba
 Persmin

Stadiums and locations

First stage

West Division

East Division

Second stage

Group A

Group B

Third-place match

Final

Relegation play-offs
Due to the forced relegation of Persebaya Surabaya, the bottom two teams from each division compete in the play-offs for the last remaining place in the 2006 season. All matches were held in Si Jalak Harupat Stadium.

Awards

Top scorers
This is a list of the top scorers from the 2005 season.

Best player
 Christian Warobay (Persipura)

References

External links
Indonesia - List of final tables (RSSSF)

Top level Indonesian football league seasons
Indonesian Premier Division seasons
1
1
Indonesia
Indonesia